Ceru-Băcăinți is a commune located in Alba County, Transylvania, Romania. It has a population of 376 and is composed of ten villages: Bolovănești, Bulbuc (Bulbuk), Ceru-Băcăinți, Cucuta, Curpeni (Kurpény), Dumbrăvița, Fântânele, Groși, Valea Mare (Váleamáre) and Viezuri (Gyézuri házcsoport).

The commune is situated in the western part of the county, on the border with Hunedoara County.

References

Communes in Alba County
Localities in Transylvania